Fullerton Joint Union High School District (FJUHSD), founded in 1893 is a school district in Orange County, California that serves a fifty-square-mile area which includes the cities of Fullerton, La Habra, and small sections of Anaheim, Buena Park, Brea, La Palma, Whittier and La Habra Heights.

Within Los Angeles County it serves sections of Whittier, La Habra Heights, and the unincorporated community of East Whittier.

There are approximately 16,299 students in the union high school district and it is headed by Superintendent Steve McLaughlin.

Schools
Buena Park High School, Buena Park
Fullerton Union High School, Fullerton
La Habra High School, La Habra
La Vista High School (continuation), Fullerton
La Sierra High School, Fullerton (Independent Studies)
Sonora High School, La Habra
Sunny Hills High School, Fullerton
Troy High School, Fullerton

Feeder districts
 Buena Park School District
 Fullerton School District
 La Habra City School District
 Lowell Joint School District

References

External links

School districts in Orange County, California
School districts in Los Angeles County, California
School districts established in 1893
Education in Fullerton, California
1893 establishments in California